Bajju is Tehsil and a Panchayat Samiti in Bikaner district in the state of Rajasthan, India.

Original name of Bajju is Bajju khalsa, before independence it was part of Jaisalmer and people of Bajju were very directly accountable for lagan to Maharaja of Jaisalmer.

Geography
Bajju is situated in Bikaner district of Rajasthan in India. The geographical coordinates i.e. latitude and longitude of Bajju is 27.93 and 72.51 respectively.

See also
 Kolayat
 Bikaner

References

Bikaner district